Curtis Ezell Kelly (born April 11, 1988) is an American professional basketball player who last played for the Magnolia Hotshots of the Philippine Basketball Association (PBA).

References

External links 
Sports-Reference.com Profile
Basket.co.il Profile
Kansas State bio

1988 births
Living people
American expatriate basketball people in Israel
American expatriate basketball people in Italy
American expatriate basketball people in Lebanon
American expatriate basketball people in the Philippines
American expatriate basketball people in Turkey
American men's basketball players
Basketball players from New York City
Hapoel Tel Aviv B.C. players
Kansas State Wildcats men's basketball players
Maccabi Ashdod B.C. players
Maccabi Kiryat Gat B.C. players
Magnolia Hotshots players
Philippine Basketball Association imports
Sportspeople from the Bronx
UConn Huskies men's basketball players
Vanoli Cremona players
Centers (basketball)
Power forwards (basketball)